The Senne or Zenne is a small river that flows through Brussels, left tributary of the Dijle/Dyle.

Its source is in the village of Naast near the municipality of Soignies. It is an indirect tributary of the Scheldt, through the Dijle and the Rupel. It joins the Dijle at Zennegat, in Battel in the north of the municipality of Mechelen, only a few hundred metres before the Dijle itself joins the Rupel.

The Woluwe is one of the tributaries of the Senne.

In the centre of Brussels, the Senne was completely covered up and major boulevards were built over top in the 19th and early 20th centuries. It is still visible in the outskirts of Brussels and outside the city, though within the city it now runs mostly underneath the small ring. The Senne was notorious for being one of Belgium's worst polluted rivers, since all effluents from the Brussels Capital Region emptied into it without treatment. In March 2007, the completion of new sewage treatment plants began to remediate this problem. However, in December 2009, the plant Brussels Nord of Acquiris was temporarily and abruptly shut down, creating a political and ecological crisis.

The yellow iris became used as the emblem of the Brussels-Capital Region due to its habitat in the marshy plains around the river. The unique seasonal wild yeasts of the Senne river valley are used in the production of the regional lambic style of beer. The Brasserie de la Senne is a recently opened brewery named for the river.

Despite the covering up of the Senne resulting in the river being all but invisible in the centre of Brussels, it has had a cultural impact on the city. A nickname for residents of the city, "Zinneke", is taken from the stray dogs which hung around the Senne in the Middle Ages, known as "Zenneke" or "Zinneke". The name was revived at the start of the 21st century with the creation of the Zinneke Parade, a multicultural biennial event in the centre of Brussels.

Gallery

References

Subterranean rivers
Rivers of Belgium
Rivers of Antwerp Province
Rivers of Brussels
Rivers of Flemish Brabant
Rivers of Hainaut (province)
Rivers of Walloon Brabant